Cinemateca Nacional del Ecuador is a film archive located in Ecuador. It was established in 1981 and the collection comprises 4000 films and 10,000 documents.

See also 
 List of film archives
 Cinema of Ecuador

References

External links 
 https://web.archive.org/web/20160215025903/http://www.cinematecaecuador.com/

Archives in Ecuador
Film archives in South America
1981 establishments in South America